= Gary Wilcox (scholar) =

American media and marketing scholar

Gary Wilcox is an American media and marketing scholar, currently the John A. Beck Centennial Professor in Communication at University of Texas at Austin.

Wilcox was Chair of the Department of Advertising from 1990 until 1998, and has been Director of Graduate Programs in Advertising since 1998. Dr. Wilcox has also been an Associated Faculty in Statistics & Data Science at UT Austin and is now currently an Affiliated Faculty in the Nelson Center for Brand and Demand Analytics and Center for Health Communication in the Moody College at UT Austin.

His articles have been published in the International Journal of Advertising, Journal of Advertising Research, Journal of Advertising, Journal of Digital and Social Media Marketing, Journal of Food Products Marketing, and Marketing Management Journal.
